The Albert Order was created on 31 December 1850 by King Frederick Augustus II of Saxony to commemorate Albert III, Duke of Saxony (known as Albert the Bold). It was to be awarded to anyone who had served the state well, for civil virtue, science and art.

Design
The design was a Christian cross with a bust of Albert the Bold at the centre. In 1875, however, it was discovered the bust was in fact the wrong Albert, Albert the Perennial, and the correct image was substituted and used thereafter.

Grades
The grade structure of the Albert Order changed several times.

At first, there were five classes: Grand Cross (Großkreuz), Commander's Cross 1st Class (Komturkreuz I), Commander's Cross 2nd Class (Komturkreuz II), Knight's Cross (Ritterkreuz) and Small Cross (Kleinkreuz). These provided the basis for a series of changes over the following forty years. On 18 March 1858, the Small Cross was renamed as the Honour Cross (Ehrenkreuz) and a sixth class was established with a gold and silver Merit Medal (Verdienstmedaille).  A Merit Cross (Verdienstkreuz) with Swords was added on 29 October 1866 and this was extended on 9 December 1870 with the Merit Cross with Swords on Ring.

The medals were abolished on 2 February 1876 and the Knights Cross was split into two classes. On 30 April 1884, a gold Great Cross was added and on 11 June 1890, the Officer's Cross was inserted into the Order between the Knight's Cross 1st Class and the Commander's Cross 2nd Class. So, at its abolition in 1918, the Order was structured thus:
Gold Grand Cross (Goldgroßkreuz)
Grand Cross (Großkreuz)
Commander's Cross 1st Class (Komturkreuz I. Klasse)
Commander's Cross (Komturkreuz II. Klasse)
Officer's Cross (Offizierskreuz)
Knight's Cross 1st Class (Ritterkreuz I. Klasse)
Knight's Cross 2nd Class (Ritterkreuz II. Klasse)
Honour Cross (Ehrenkreuz)
Merit Cross (Verdienstkreuz) with Swords

An award of Swords indicated a recipient's bravery in wartime. If, however, a recipient was subsequently awarded a higher grade in the Order, he could lose the bravery distinction attached to the superseded grade (regulations only allowed the display of the insignia of the highest awarded grade). This anomaly was solved in 1906 by allowing the addition of Swords by replacement of insignia. A recipient, however, had to pay the cost of replacement and this appears to have inhibited the numbers of such replacements.

Recipients 

 Gold Grand Crosses
 Svasti Sobhana
 Grand Crosses
 Abbas II of Egypt
 Albert of Saxony
 Alexander, Margrave of Meissen
 Alfred, 2nd Prince of Montenuovo
 Princess Anna of Saxony (1903–1976)
 Gustav Bachmann
 Friedrich von Bernhardi
 Theobald von Bethmann Hollweg
 Hans Alexis von Biehler
 Gaetano Bisleti
 Herbert von Bismarck
 Moritz von Bissing
 Adolf von Bonin
 Felix Graf von Bothmer
 Rudolf von Brudermann
 Bernhard von Bülow
Hans von Bülow
 Eduard von Capelle
 Rudolf von Delbrück
 Karl Ludwig d'Elsa
 Max von Fabeck
 Eduard von Fransecky
 George, King of Saxony
 Friedrich von Georgi
 Heinrich von Gossler
 Gottlieb Graf von Haeseler
 Max von Hausen
 Samu Hazai
 Prince Henry of Prussia (1862–1929)
 Prince Konrad of Hohenlohe-Schillingsfürst
 Dietrich von Hülsen-Haeseler
 Oskar von Hutier
 Friedrich von Ingenohl
 John of Saxony
 Hans von Kaltenborn-Stachau
 Georg von Kameke
 Hans von Kirchbach
 Hugo von Kirchbach
 Konstantin of Hohenlohe-Schillingsfürst
 Ewald von Lochow
 Joseph Maximilian von Maillinger
 Maria Emanuel, Margrave of Meissen
 Georg Alexander von Müller
 Hans von Plessen
 Antoni Wilhelm Radziwiłł
 Wilhelm von Ramming
 Albrecht von Roon
 Prince Rudolf of Liechtenstein
 Reinhard Scheer
 Alfred von Schlieffen
 Ehrhard Schmidt
 Ludwig von Schröder
 Gustav von Senden-Bibran
 Rudolf Stöger-Steiner von Steinstätten
 Ludwig Freiherr von und zu der Tann-Rathsamhausen
 Alfred von Tirpitz
 Wilhelm von Tümpling
 Julius von Verdy du Vernois
 Victor II, Duke of Ratibor
 Alfred von Waldersee
 Wilhelm Karl, Duke of Urach
 Ferdinand von Zeppelin
 Commander's Cross 1st Class
 Friedrich Boedicker
 Paul Puhallo von Brlog
 Adolf von Deines
 Friedrich Albrecht Erlenmeyer
 Georg, Crown Prince of Saxony
 Franz von Hipper
 Maximilian von Laffert
 Otto von Moser
 Karl von Plettenberg
 Wilhelm Souchon
 Constantin von Tischendorf
 Arthur Zimmermann
 Commander's Cross 2nd Class
 Frane Bulic
 Karl von Bülow
 Leo von Caprivi
 Friedrich August Eckstein
 August Leskien
 Karl Max, Prince Lichnowsky
 Christian Otto Mohr
 Hubert von Rebeur-Paschwitz
 Ludwig von Reuter
 Emidio Taliani
 Ferdinand Walter
 Ernst Windisch
 Officer's Crosses
Martin Chales de Beaulieu
 Paul von Bruns
 Géza Fejérváry
 Friedrich von Gerok (officer)
 Adolf Wild von Hohenborn
 Walther Reinhardt
 Eberhard Graf von Schmettow
 Walther Schroth
 Otto von Stülpnagel
 Knight's Crosses 1st Class
 Kurt Agricola
 Joachim von Amsberg (general)
 Ludwig Beck
 Werner von Blomberg
 Eduard Brockhaus
 Fritz von Brodowski
 Adolf von Brudermann
 Kurt Eberhard
 Waldemar Erfurth
 Friedrich Fahnert
 Andreas von Fail-Griessler
 Victor Franke
 Hermann Geyer
 Curt Haase
 Kurt von Hammerstein-Equord
 Christian Hansen (general)
 Paul von Hase
 Paul Hausser
 Waldemar Henrici
 Bruno Héroux
 Wilhelm Heye
 Ernst von Hoeppner
 Hugo Richard Jüngst
 Albrecht Kurzwelly
 Paul Laux
 Felix von Luckner
 Oswald Lutz
 Friedrich Olbricht
 Johann Pflugbeil
 Friedrich Wilhelm Ritschl
 Gustav Schreck
 Ernst von Schuch
 Johann Gottfried Stallbaum
 Hans Stohwasser
 Hans von Tettau
 Walter von Unruh
 Heinrich von Vietinghoff
 Hubert Weise
 Walther Wever (general)
 Knight's Crosses 2nd Class
 Frane Bulic
 Karl von Bülow
 Leo von Caprivi
 Friedrich August Eckstein
 August Leskien
 Karl Max, Prince Lichnowsky
 Christian Otto Mohr
 Oskar Potiorek
 Hubert von Rebeur-Paschwitz
 Ludwig von Reuter
 Emidio Taliani
 Ferdinand Walter
 Honour Crosses
 Merit Crosses
 Unclassified
 Frederick Augustus III of Saxony
 Otto Hahn
 Otto Hersing
 Heinrich Kirchweger
 Julius Kühn
 Arno von Lenski
 Georg Pittrich
 Friedrich Sixt von Armin
 Vladimir Sukhomlinov
 Anton de Waal

References

Orders, decorations, and medals of Saxony
Awards established in 1850